Melissa Kounnas is an Australian actress and television presenter, best known for her role in the children's television series Professor Poopsnaggle and His Flying Zeppelin as Robyn. She is a television presenter for infomercials such as Guthy Renker on morning television.

Kounnas has appeared in the television series E Street and A Country Practice, and the movie Dating the Enemy.

Personal life
Her brother is actor and television presenter Mark Kounnas.

References

External links

Australian television actresses
Australian people of Greek descent
Living people
Year of birth missing (living people)